Iva Yeo (born June 5, 1939 in Winnipeg, Manitoba) is a politician in Manitoba, Canada.  She was a member of the Legislative Assembly of Manitoba from 1988 to 1990, representing the Winnipeg riding of Sturgeon Creek for the Manitoba Liberal Party.

Background
The daughter of Arthur W.S. Hay and Irene Stewart, she was educated at the Winnipeg General Hospital and the University of Saskatchewan, and worked as a nurse educator at the St. Boniface School for Practical Nurses, as well as working in student affairs at St. Boniface Schools of Nursing. In 1961, she married Dr. Thomas Archie Yeo.

Political career
She served as a school trustee in the 1980s, in the district of Silver Heights-Booth.
In the provincial election of 1988, she defeated incumbent Progressive Conservative Frank Johnston by 659 votes in Sturgeon Creek.  The Manitoba Liberals increased their parliamentary representation from one to twenty in this election, and Yeo sat in the official opposition for the next two years.  In the 1990 provincial election, she lost to Tory Gerry McAlpine by 769 votes amid a general loss of support for her party.

Election results

References

1939 births
Living people
Manitoba Liberal Party MLAs
Politicians from Winnipeg
University of Saskatchewan alumni
Women MLAs in Manitoba